Karlovo Peak is a 300 m peak in Delchev Ridge, Tangra Mountains on eastern Livingston Island in the South Shetland Islands, Antarctica. It has partly ice-free north slopes, and precipitous south-eastern ones, and surmounts the east extremity of Sopot Ice Piedmont to the north.

The peak was named after the Bulgarian town of Karlovo.

Location

Maps
 L.L. Ivanov et al. Antarctica: Livingston Island and Greenwich Island, South Shetland Islands. Scale 1:100000 topographic map. Sofia: Antarctic Place-names Commission of Bulgaria, 2005.
 L.L. Ivanov. Antarctica: Livingston Island and Greenwich, Robert, Snow and Smith Islands. Scale 1:120000 topographic map.  Troyan: Manfred Wörner Foundation, 2009.

References
 Karlovo Peak. SCAR Composite Antarctic Gazetteer
 Bulgarian Antarctic Gazetteer. Antarctic Place-names Commission. (details in Bulgarian, basic data in English)

External links
 Karlovo Peak. Copernix satellite image

Tangra Mountains
Karlovo